Crying The Neck is a harvest festival tradition once common in counties of Devon and Cornwall in the United Kingdom in Europe. The tradition declined following the invention of machines such as the combine harvester.

The tradition is no longer known to be practised in Devon. In Cornwall, however, the tradition was revived in the early twentieth century by the Old Cornwall Society.

Ceremony
In The Story of Cornwall, by Kenneth Hamilton Jenkin, the following explanation is given on the practice:

"In those days the whole of the reaping had to be done either with the hook or scythe. The harvest, in consequence, often lasted for many weeks. When the time came to cut the last handful of standing corn, one of the reapers would lift up the bunch high above his head and call out in a loud voice.....,

"I 'ave 'un! I 'ave 'un! I 'ave 'un!"

The rest would then shout,

"What 'ave 'ee? What 'ave 'ee? What 'ave 'ee?"

and the reply would be:

"A neck! A neck! A neck!"

Everyone then joined in shouting:

"Hurrah! Hurrah for the neck! Hurrah for Mr. So-and-So" 
(calling the farmer by name.)"

Sometimes the ceremony is given in the Cornish Language:

An Tregher (the reaper) – “Yma genef! Yma genef! Yma genef!”

An Re erel (the others) – “Pandr’us genes? Pandr’us genes? Pandr’us genes?”

An Tregher – “Pen Yar! Pen Yar! Pen Yar!”

An Re erel – “Houra! Houra! Houra!”

Robert Hunt wrote in his Popular Romances of the West of England that the neck would be hung in the farmhouse after the ceremony.

Modern popular culture
In a harvest scene in the third episode of the second series of the 2015 of Poldark, Francis Poldark performs the tradition at Trenwith, his estate.

In a harvest scene in the third episode of supernatural drama The Living and the Dead (S01 E03), Charlotte Appleby performs the tradition at her husband's family farm, which she manages.

See also 

Harvest festival
Guldize

References

External links
The custom as described in 1836 by W. Hone from the Legendary Dartmoor webpage
What exactly is a Corn Dolly? Picture of a Cornish Neck from The Guild of Straw Craftsmen website.

Traditions
Cornish folklore
Autumn traditions
Cornish culture
Culture in Devon
Festivals in Cornwall
Autumn events in England